Zipangu is a 1980 work for string orchestra by Canadian composer Claude Vivier. Inspired by traditional kabuki theatre, it is considered by many to be the composer's most aggressive and "unforgiving" piece, as it features a plethora of extended techniques for strings (i.e. snap pizzicato and bow overpressure) and denser harmonic content atop a complex melody, similar to the string compositions of Krzysztof Penderecki. A typical performance lasts around sixteen minutes.

History
Vivier visitied kabuki theatres in the Tokyo area during a 1976 voyage to Japan, and was struck by the ritual-like nature of both the music and physical performance. Zipangu was later written in 1980 as a Japanese-infused work for string orchestra, with elements of South Indian Carnatic music (dronal imitation of the tanbur, rhythmic tala, further raga manipulation and chalanata, etc.) — the name of the piece is taken from a former and antiquated exonym for Japan, roughly translated to mean "the land of sunrise".

The piece was completed in Vivier's Montreal apartment on 13 August 1980, and premiered on 4 April 1981, as part of the "New Music Concerts" program at the University of Toronto in Ontario, Canada. The conductor, Robert Aitken, was a friend of Vivier's and had his endorsement to conduct the premiere.

Composition

Analysis
The piece begins with a senza vib. drone on the note E in the bass, cellos, violas, and seventh violin. The harmonics and timbral content of the drone gradually changes as Vivier calls for bow positions and pressure to slowly and repetitively move in a cycle.

Program notes
The notes given by Vivier in the finished manuscript, with English translation:
« Zipangu » était le nom donné au Japon à l'époque de Marco Polo. Autour d'une mélodie, j'explore dans cette oeuvre différents aspects de la « couleur ». J'ai tenté de « brouiller » mes
structures harmoniques par l'emploi de différentes techniques d’archet. Ainsi s'opposent un bruit coloré obtenu par pression exagérée de l'archet sur les cordes et les harmoniques pures losqu'on revient à la technique normale. Une mélodie devient couleur (accords), s'allège et revient peu à peu comme purifiée et solitaire.
"Zipangu" was the name given to Japan at the time of Marco Polo. Within the frame of a single melody I explore in this work different aspects of colour. I tried to "blur" my harmonic structure through different bowing techniques. A colourful sound is obtained by applying exaggerated bow pressure on the strings as opposed to pure harmonics when returning to normal technique. A melody becomes a colour (chords), grows lighter and slowly returns as though purified and solitary.
These program notes are the first recorded example of Vivier's later fascination with Marco Polo. Before his death, he had begun working on an opéra fleuve (lit. "river opera") portraying the explorers life, entitled Rêves d'un Marco Polo — only the prelude has survived, and it remains one of his most performed compositions.

Instrumentation
The work is written for a miniaturized string orchestra, with thirteen performers.
Strings
7 Violins
3 Violas
2 Cellos
1 Bass

See also
 Bowed string instrument extended technique

References

Citations

Sources

External links
 

1980 compositions
Compositions by Claude Vivier
Compositions for string orchestra
Compositions that use extended techniques
Modernist compositions